Dimethyldienolone (developmental code name RU-2788), or 7α,17α-dimethyldienolone, also known as δ9-7α,17α-dimethyl-19-nortestosterone or as 7α,17α-dimethylestr-4,9-dien-17β-ol-3-one, is a 17α-alkylated androgen/anabolic steroid of the 19-nortestosterone group which was never marketed. It is closely related to dimethyltrienolone, as well as to mibolerone and metribolone. Dimethyldienolone shows high affinity for the androgen and progesterone receptors.

See also
 List of androgens/anabolic steroids

References

Tertiary alcohols
Androgens and anabolic steroids
Conjugated dienes
Estranes
Hepatotoxins
Enones
Progestogens